Alen Vitasović (born 5 July 1968) is a Croatian pop singer and songwriter. Born in Pula, many of his songs are about his native Istria and mostly written in Chakavian dialect.

Vitasović began his music career early, learning how to play the harmonica at the age of five, and by twelve he was singing in bands, mainly in the tourist regions around Istria. After finishing music school in Pula, where he learned to play the piano and saxophone, he continued to play in bands across Croatia and Slovenia, until he was discovered while working at Radio HR Pula in the early 1990s. In 1993, Vitasović released his first single and continued to tour all over Croatia, making a name for himself.

Vitasović continued with his success, winning numerous festivals and awards throughout Croatia. In 1995, he was nominated for five Porin music awards, and was also the winner of the festivals in Split, Zadar, Pula, Vodice, and Korčula. In 1997, he was awarded the Order of Danica Hrvatska "Marko Marulić" (Red Danice hrvatske s likom Marka Marulića) by the President of Croatia for his contribution to Croatian music and culture. 

Vitasović has collaborated with various music acts, including Crvena jabuka, Hari Rončević, Lisa Hunt, and Marko Perković.

Discography

Albums
 1994 – Gušti su gušti
 1995 – Svi festivali
 1997 – Come va?
 2000 – Ja ne gren
 2003 – Grih
 2003 – Tone i pretelji

Singles

References

Dora: Alen Vitasovic

External links
 Diskografija
 Biography
 Official Facebook Page

1968 births
Living people
21st-century Croatian male singers
Croatian pop singers
People from Pula
20th-century Croatian male singers